Clarence Dewitt Osborne (November 23, 1934 – September 9, 2017) was an American football player who played with the San Francisco 49ers, Minnesota Vikings, and Oakland Raiders. He played college football at Arizona State University. Clancy Osborne grew up in Blythe, California. He died in 2017.

References

1934 births
2017 deaths
American football linebackers
Arizona State Sun Devils football players
San Francisco 49ers players
Minnesota Vikings players
Oakland Raiders players
Players of American football from Texas
Sportspeople from Lubbock, Texas
American Football League players